The morning glory Calystegia soldanella (syn. Convolvulus soldanella) is a species of bindweed known by various common names such as sea bindweed, seashore false bindweed, shore bindweed, shore convolvulus and beach morning glory.

Description
It is a perennial vine which grows in beach sand and other coastal habitats in temperate regions across the world. It is also known as 'The Prince's Flower' after Prince Charles Edward Stuart who sowed it on the Island of Eriskay, Scotland, when he landed there in 1745 to lead the Jacobite rising.

The plant bears trailing, fleshy stems, kidney-shaped leaves, and creamy-white flower buds and attractive morning glory-like flowers with corollas delicate pink to vivid lavender. They are insect-pollinated.

Distribution
In North America Calystegia soldanella is found on the west coast and selected areas of the east coast. In the United Kingdom it is widespread on the sandy coasts of England and Wales, less common in Scotland and Northern Ireland. It is also widespread around the coast of Ireland and Mediterranean coast.

References

soldanella
Flora of Australia
Flora of California
Flora of New Zealand
Flora of Oregon
Flora of Washington (state)
Flora of North America
Taxa named by Robert Brown (botanist, born 1773)
Flora of Malta
Flora without expected TNC conservation status